The Egyptian Revolution may refer to:

 The ʻUrabi revolt, a nationalist uprising in Egypt from 1879 to 1882
 The 1919 Egyptian Revolution, led by Saad Zaghlul and the Wafd Party
 The 1952 Egyptian Revolution, led by Muhammad Naguib, Gamal Abdel Nasser, and the Free Officers Movement
 Corrective Revolution (Egypt), a purge by Sadat against Nasserist elements of the government
 Egyptian Crisis (2011–2014), a period of unrest and government change in Egypt
 2011 Egyptian revolution, a series of mass popular protests leading to the resignation of Hosni Mubarak
 2013 Egyptian coup d'état, the overthrow of President Morsi by General  el-Sisi